The 2019 African Women's Junior Handball Championship was held in Niamey, Niger from 5 to 14 September 2019. It also acted as qualification tournament for the 2020 Women's Junior World Handball Championship to be held in Romania.

Draw
The draw was held on 14 August 2019 at the CAHB Headquarters in Abidjan, Ivory Coast.

Preliminary round
All times are local (UTC+1).

Group A

Group B

Knockout stage

Bracket

5–8th place bracket

5–8th place semifinals

Semifinals

Seventh place game

Fifth place game

Third place game

Final

Final standings

Awards

References

2019 in African handball
African Women's Junior Handball Championship
International handball competitions hosted by Niger
African Junior
Junior
African Women's Junior Handball Championship